Wallabies Nunataks is a large group of nunataks near the polar plateau, lying 10 nautical miles (18 km) northeast of All-Blacks Nunataks at the east side of the Byrd Neve. Named by the New Zealand Geological Survey Antarctic Expedition (NZGSAE) (1960–61) for the Australian national rugby team.

Mount Stent lies at the southern extreme of the nunataks.

See also
Mount Exley, a mountain at 1,980 metres (6,500 ft) in the Wallabies Nunataks
Woodgyer Peak

References

Nunataks of Oates Land